Demir Vlonjati (c. 1780–1845) born Demir Mystehaku and also known as Demir Aga Vlonjakasi  was an Albanian folk singer, composer and poet.

Demir Mystehaku was born in Matogjin, southern Albania around 1780 and died there in 1845. He became a famous singer and created a new genre of Albanian polyphonic music named demirçe after him. This genre influenced the works of another famous composer from the same region, Qazim Ademi. In 1845 he wrote an octosyllabic poem in nineteen quatrains condemning a massacre in Vlorë region committed by Ottoman Turkish forces that year and the negative effects of the Tanzimat on Albania.

Sources 

1780 births
1845 deaths
People from Selenicë
19th-century Albanian male singers
Albanian songwriters
19th-century Albanian poets
19th-century composers
Male singer-songwriters
Albanian male poets
19th-century male writers